The Salish-class vessels are four intermediate-capacity ferries operated by BC Ferries and were built in 2016 at Remontowa Shipbuilding S.A. in Gdańsk, Poland. They were the first dual-fuel powered vessels in British Columbia service, capable of using liquified natural gas or diesel oil to operate. Salish Orca entered service on the Comox–Powell River route in May 2017. Salish Eagle entered service on the Tsawwassen–Southern Gulf Islands route in June 2017. Salish Raven entered service for the Southern Gulf Islands on August 3, 2017.

Description
They are powered by dual-fuel engines capable of using liquified natural gas (LNG) or diesel fuel to operate. They were the first vessels in British Columbia to be powered by LNG. Each ship has two car decks. The ferries have several amenities aboard including a cafeteria, a gift shop and areas for children and pets.

Vessels

Construction and career
Salish Orca was the first completed, in November 2016, and entered service on May 15, 2017. Salish Eagle was completed in February 2017 and entered service that June. Salish Raven was completed in April 2017 and entered service ahead of schedule on August 3, 2017, after Queen of Nanaimo had significant mechanical issues preventing the ship from continued service. Salish Raven and Salish Eagle sail on the Southern Gulf Islands–Tsawwassen route. Sailish Orca sails on the Powell River–Comox route.

Construction for the fourth Salish-class vessel began on February 4, 2020. The ship was planned to complete sea trials in 2021 before arriving in British Columbia to be outfitted and ultimately enter service in 2022. On March 23, 2021, BC Ferries announced that the name for the fourth Salish-class vessel would be Salish Heron. 
Salish Heron, started its journey to British Columbia on December 22, 2021 from Gdansk, Poland bound for Victoria. The journey also included a stopover in Manzanillo in Mexico. The ship finally arrived in Victoria on March 3, 2022. The vessel entered service on May 6, 2022 after having its artwork painted to its hull.

Shortly after entering service, the Salish-class vessels experienced several problems; the first was that there was no galley ventilation system and at times the cafeteria's kitchen would reach extreme temperatures, making it unsafe for crews to work in the kitchen. In early 2018, all three Salish-class vessels had a galley ventilation system installed, fixing the issue. The ships' elevators and issues with refuelling were problems; both issues were resolved when the ships were sent to local shipyards for repairs.

On November 7, 2019, Salish Raven suffered a malfunction in one of its propellers at roughly 9:30am after leaving Pender Island. A tugboat arrived to aid the ferry and all its passengers were disembarked by 1:30pm. The vessel resumed sailing later that day.

References 

Ships of BC Ferries
Ferry classes